Kadambini is a daily Bengali soap opera which was premiered on Zee Bangla and digital platform ZEE5. The show starred Ushasi Ray and Manoj Ojha in lead roles. The show was launched on 6 July 2020 and went to off-air within three months on 3 October 2020 owing to its deformability of historical screenplay and low rating.

Plot 
The story revolves around 19th century and 20th century's starting, when many people were trying to reform the society. Ladies were violated at this time. The story shows the struggle of a lady, Kadambini Ganguly née Bose, who stood up against violence and became the first Bengali lady doctor in this era.

Cast

Main 
Ushashi Roy as Kadambini Ganguly née Bose aka Bini.
Manoj Ojha as Dwarkanath Ganguly aka Dwaraka

Recurring 
Debdut Ghosh as Brajokishore Bose: Kadambini's  father.
Lopamudra Sinha as Pramodbala Devi: Kadambini's mother
Debopriya Basu as Saudamini Bose: Kadambini's sister. 
Oindrila Saha as Bidhumukhi Devi: Dwaraka's daughter aka Bidhu.
Ankit Mazumder as Satish Ganguly: Dwaraka's son aka Satish.
Ananya Sengupta as Tarasundori Devi aka Tara: Dwaraka's sister.
Nandini Chatterjee as Udaytara Devi: Dwaraka's mother.
Sumanta Mukherjee as Krishnapran Gangopadhyay: Dwarka's father.
Sahana Sen / Anindita Raychaudhury as Surobala: Manmotho's mother.
Sayak Chakraborty as Manmotho.
Soumi Chakrobarty as Sarala Roy(Das): Dwaraka's student
Ashmee Ghosh as Abala Bose(Das): Dwaraka's student
Poonam Basak as Bula:Kadambini"s Friend
Sandip Chakraborty as Durga Mohan Das: Sarala and Abala's father
Rupsha Chakraborty as Brahmamoyee Devi: Sarala and Abala's mother
Chandraniv Mukherjee as Monmohon Ghose.
Twarita Chatterjee as Swarnalata Ghose: Monmohon's wife.
Sreemoyee Chattoraj as Swarnaprobha Bose: Dwaraka's student.
Shirsha Guhathakurta as Protima.
Subhrajit Dutta as Prankrishna Dutta.
Dhrubajyoti Sarkar as Niranjan Mitra: Kadambini's former fiancé
Sanjuktaa Roy Chowdhury as Priyadarshini mitra: Niranjan's mother.
Gautam Mukherjee as Bhavesh Mitra: Niranjan's father.
Shobhana Bhunia as Kaveri Mitra: Niranjan's sister-in-law.
Indrajit Mazumder as Dr. Rajendraprashad Chandra. 
Debshankar Haldar as Dr. Mahendralal Sarkar

References 

Bengali-language television programming in India
2020 Indian television series debuts
Zee Bangla original programming
2020 Indian television series endings